James Macfarlane may refer to:

 James Macfarlane (Tasmanian politician) (1844–1914), member of the Australian Senate for Tasmania
 James Macfarlane (Western Australian politician) (1865–1942), member of the Western Australian Legislative Council
 James Macfarlane (moderator) (1808–1866), Scottish minister and ecclesiastical author
 James MacFarlane (1866–1942), New Zealand cricketer

See also
 James Macfarlan (1832–1862), Scottish poet